Sirghe  was a Roman and Byzantine era city in the Roman province of Lydia in Asia Minor (modern Turkey).
Sirghe was on the south bank of the Hermos River, near the town of Bageis(probably opposite) and minted its own coins. Sirghe

References

Roman towns and cities in Turkey
Populated places of the Byzantine Empire
Former populated places in Turkey
Populated places in ancient Lydia
Lost ancient cities and towns